Barrelhead Root Beer is a brand of root beer that used to be manufactured by Dr Pepper Snapple Group, but was re-launched in September 2016 as a new product by Barrelhead Ventures LLC, a Pennsylvania-based company.

It was originally marketed as "draft style" root beer.  One of their marketing points was the flavor, which was said to be strong enough to stand up to a mug full of ice without becoming watered down.  The "jingle" on their radio commercials was, "For old fashioned flavor, take our advice, drink Barrelhead root beer, and don't spare the ice, 'cause it's real draft style root beer, with real draft style foam, 'cause Barrelhead has, Barrelhead has, brought homestyle root beer home!"

In September 2016, at the Atlantic City Seafood Festival, Barrelhead Ventures re-launched the soft drink brand.

External links 
Old bottle

Root beer